Alexander III (1609 – 1 March 1660), was a Georgian monarch of the Bagrationi Dynasty, who reigned as king of Imereti from 1639 to 1660.

Reign 

Alexander succeeded upon the death of his father, George III of Imereti, in 1639. Most of his reign was spent in the struggle against the powerful prince of Mingrelia, Levan II Dadiani, who refused to acknowledge the king of Imereti as his overlord, and aspired to displace him from his throne. In one of the battles, Dadiani captured and blinded Alexander’s energetic brother Mamuka, bringing the king to the edge of despair. Alexander’s father-in-law, Teimuraz I of Kakheti, who had fled the Saffavid Persian invasion of his country to Imereti, attempted to mediate the conflict, but nothing came of this.

Both Mingelian and Imeretian rulers sought Russian support in their cause. Envoys from Moscow visited Mingrelia in 1639/40, though without achieving any positive results. In response to an appeal from Alexander, another embassy arrived in the Imeretian capital of Kutaisi in 1651, and, on October 9, Alexander took an oath of fealty to Tsar Alexis Mikhailovich. As the Russian were still too far from South Caucasus, this move had virtually no effect on the course of events, though. It was not until Levan’s death in 1657 that Alexander was able to avenge his earlier setbacks. He immediately marched into Mingrelia, subdued its nobles and installed his own nominee, Vameq, as prince-Dadiani. In 1659, he also interfered in the Principality of Guria, and replaced the refractory prince Kaikhosro I with his protégé Demetre Gurieli. Thus, for a short time, the authority of the crown of Imereti was reestablished throughout western Georgia.

Family 
Alexander was married twice. His first wife was Tamar, daughter of Mamia II Gurieli, whom Alexander married in 1618 and divorced in 1620. He married secondly, in 1629, Nestan-Darejan, daughter of Teimuraz I of Kakheti. All of his children were born of the first marriage:
 Bagrat V (1620–1681), King of Imereti (1660–1681).  
 Prince Klimenti (fl. 1651).
 Princess Tinatin (fl. 1661 – 1680), who was married to the nobleman Lasha-Giorgi Goshadze and then to Levan III Dadiani.

References

 Вахушти Багратиони (Vakhushti Bagrationi) (1745). История Царства Грузинского: Жизнь Имерети.
David Marshall Lang, The Last Years of the Georgian Monarchy, 1658-1832. New York: Columbia University Press, 1957.

1609 births
1660 deaths
Bagrationi dynasty of the Kingdom of Imereti
Kings of Imereti
17th-century people from Georgia (country)
Eastern Orthodox monarchs